Radical 52 or radical short thread meaning "" or "" is one of the 31 Kangxi radicals (214 radicals in total) composed of three strokes.

In the Kangxi Dictionary, there are 50 characters (out of 49,030) to be found under this radical.

 is also the 59th indexing component in the Table of Indexing Chinese Character Components predominantly adopted by Simplified Chinese dictionaries published in mainland China.

Evolution

Derived characters

Variant forms
There is a design nuance in different printing typefaces for this radical. While the character is always written in 3 strokes, in traditional typefaces, the first and the second turning strokes are broken into two respectively to adapt to the carving of movable type systems, and usually there is a gap between the first and the second strokes. Currently, in both Simplified Chinese and Traditional Chinese, the discontinuous turning strokes in standard printing fonts are merged into one to imitate its handwriting form, though the traditional printing form is still widely used in Traditional Chinese publication. The traditional form remains standard in modern Japanese and Korean printing typefaces.

This difference exists only in printing typefaces, not in any handwriting form.

Literature

External links

Unihan Database - U+5E7A

052
059